Morgan Talty is a Penobscot writer and an assistant professor of English in Creative Writing and Native American and Contemporary Literature at the University of Maine in Orono.

Early life and education
Morgan Talty was born in Bridgeport, Connecticut and lived there until he was six. He and his mother then moved to the Penobscot Indian Nation in Maine where he lived until the age of eighteen. He started studying creative writing in community college. Talty graduated from Dartmouth College and  Stonecoast MFA Program in Creative Writing.

Career
He teaches at Stonecoast and at the University of Maine. His work has appeared in Narrative Magazine, Granta, RED INK and The Georgia Review.

Night of the Living Rez (2022) 
Night of the Living Rez was published July 5, 2022 by Tin House Books.

The book received starred reviews from Booklist, Kirkus Reviews, and Publishers Weekly. Publishers Weekly ultimately named it one of the top ten works of fiction published in 2022. Further, Night of the Living Rez won the New England Book Award for Fiction and was a runner-up for the Barnes & Noble Discover Prize. It's also a finalist for The Story Prize. It was a finalist for the 2023 John Leonard Prize, awarded by the National Book Critics Circle for a first book in any genre.

Publications 

 Night of the Living Rez, Tin House Books (July, 2022)

References 

Penobscot people
21st-century American novelists
Living people
Year of birth missing (living people)
American male novelists
Dartmouth College alumni
University of Southern Maine alumni
University of Southern Maine faculty
University of Maine faculty